William Leslie Price (19 March 1881 – 6 February 1958) played first-class cricket for Somerset in one match in the 1901 season. He was born at Taunton, Somerset and died there too.

Price played as a lower-order batsman and as wicketkeeper in his single first-class match, scoring 10 in the first innings against Yorkshire at Taunton and failing to score in the second innings.

References

1881 births
1958 deaths
English cricketers
Somerset cricketers
Sportspeople from Taunton